The 2008 FIBA Diamond Ball was a basketball tournament held in Nanjing, China, from August 2 until August 5, 2008. The FIBA Diamond Ball was an official international basketball tournament organised by FIBA, held every Olympic year prior to the Olympics. It was the 2nd edition of the FIBA Diamond Ball. The six participating teams were Australia, host China, Latvia, Mali, Russia and United States.

Participating teams

 – African champions
 – Olympic & Americas champions 
 – 2004 FIBA Diamond Ball winners (also Oceania & World champions)
 – Olympics hosts 
 – Asia Cup 3rd place (South Korea were Asia Cup champions) → replaced by   
 – European champions

Preliminary round

Group A
*All times are China Standard Time (UTC+8).

|}

Group B
*All times are China Standard Time (UTC+8).

|}

Final round
*All times are China Standard Time (UTC+8).

5th place

Third place

Final

Final standings
The final standings per FIBA official website:

References

External links 
2008 FIBA Diamond Ball Archive

FIBA competitions between national teams
 
Recurring sporting events established in 2008
Women's basketball competitions between national teams
World championships in basketball